The 2014–15 Cal Poly Mustangs men's basketball team represented California Polytechnic State University during the 2014–15 NCAA Division I men's basketball season. The Mustangs were led by sixth year head coach Joe Callero and played their home games at Mott Gym. They finished the season 13–16, 6–10 in Big West play to finish in seventh place. They lost in the quarterfinals of the Big West tournament to UC Santa Barbara.

Roster

Schedule
Source:  

|-
!colspan=9 style="background:#123C31; color:#FFF1D0;"| Non-conference games

|-
!colspan=9 style="background:#123C31; color:#FFF1D0;"| Conference games

|-
!colspan=9 style="background:#123C31; color:#FFF1D0;"| Big West tournament

References

Cal Poly Mustangs men's basketball seasons
Cal Poly
Cal Poly Mustangs men's basketball team
Cal Poly Mustangs men's basketball team